Fear and Loathing on the Road to Hollywood, also known as Fear and Loathing in Gonzovision, is a documentary film produced by BBC Omnibus in 1978 on the subject of Hunter S. Thompson, directed by Nigel Finch.

The film pairs Thompson with illustrator Ralph Steadman, as they travel to Hollywood via Death Valley and Barstow from Las Vegas. It contains interviews with Thompson and Steadman, as well as some short excerpts from some of his work.

Availability
The film is featured in The Criterion Collection edition of Fear and Loathing in Las Vegas.

Notes and references

 Fear and Loathing in Las Vegas: Criterion Collection, disc 2
 

1978 films
Works about Hunter S. Thompson
British short documentary films
Documentary films about writers
BBC television documentaries
1970s English-language films
1970s British films